Belanovce is a village in the municipality of Lipkovo, North Macedonia.

Demographics
According to the 2002 census, the village had a total of 7 inhabitants. Ethnic groups in the village include:

Albanians 7

References

External links

Villages in Lipkovo Municipality
Albanian communities in North Macedonia